Ulyandy (Ülände) is a rural locality (a village) in Tashbulatovsky Selsoviet, Abzelilovsky District, Bashkortostan, Russia. The population was 82 as of 2010. There is 1 street.

Geography 
Ulyandy is located 55 km northeast of Askarovo (the district's administrative centre) by road. Tashbulatovo is the nearest rural locality.

References 

Rural localities in Abzelilovsky District